Battle of Pavia may refer to the following battles:
Battle of Pavia (271) – Alamanni invasion of the Roman Empire
Battle of Pavia (476) – Fall of the Western Roman Empire
Siege of Pavia (569–572) – Lombard invasion of Italy
Siege of Pavia (773–774) – Conquests of Charlemagne
Battle of Pavia (1431) – Wars in Lombardy
Battle of Pavia (1525) – Italian War of 1521

See also
 Siege of Pavia (disambiguation)

Pavia